FMovies is a series of copyright infringement websites that host links and embedded videos, allowing users to stream or download movies for free.

History 
The site was created in 2016 according to TorrentFreak, and blocked from Google searches in December 2016.

In November 2017, FMovies lost a lawsuit brought by Filipino media and entertainment group ABS-CBN, and was ordered to pay $210,000.

In January 2018, the site was identified as a Notorious Market by the U.S. government, along with The Pirate Bay and other piracy sites. In October 2018, Telia Company, a Swedish ISP, was ordered to block FMovies. They appealed the order. That same month, the Motion Picture Association of America reported FMovies along with other piracy sites to the U.S. government. FMovies was blocked in Australia in December 2018, after a request in August.

In February 2019, Sweden asked advertisers to blacklist some piracy and streaming sites, which included FMovies. By April 2019, ISPs in India were ordered to block FMovies, and the U.S. government identified the site as one of the top piracy sites.

As of November 2019, there are two to four different FMovies websites running, but their locations are unknown.

See also 
 Putlocker, similar online movie streaming network
 YIFY Torrents (or YTS), online movie file downloading network
 Popcorn Time, a freeware program allowing users to watch movies through torrenting on several platforms
 123movies, similar online movie streaming network

References

BitTorrent websites
Internet properties established in 2016
Internet censorship in India